The Process of Belief is the twelfth studio album by the American punk rock band Bad Religion. It was produced by its leaders Greg Graffin and Brett Gurewitz, and was released on January 22, 2002, through Epitaph Records. After touring in support of its previous studio album, The New America (2000), Gurewitz re-joined Bad Religion in 2001 after a seven-year hiatus. The band re-signed with Epitaph, and then began work on its first album for the label in over eight years. The album also marked the first album to feature Brooks Wackerman, who replaced former drummer Bobby Schayer.

The Process of Belief was another huge success (debuting at #49 on the Billboard 200 chart) and it was well received by both critics and fans. The album has sold more than 220,000 units worldwide. The Process of Belief features one of Bad Religion's well-known songs "Sorrow", the band's first to chart in the US in six years, since "A Walk" (from 1996's The Gray Race). "Broken", "The Defense" and "Supersonic" also received radio airplay, but all failed to make any national chart (although "Broken" reached #125 on the UK Singles Chart).

The album marked the return to the faster and more energetic songwriting style of Bad Religion's earlier albums, and many have compared it favorably to their past releases. Multiple songs of the album have become live staples of the band's shows, most notably "Sorrow".

Background and recording
Bad Religion released their eleventh studio album The New America in May 2000, through Atlantic Records. Bassist Jay Bentley said there was one day where the label was dropping acts that had sold under 50,000 copies; he said that Bad Religion had sold around 61,000 but had told them: "Please throw us off too. I don't want to be a part of this anymore." Bentley said no one in the band was happy while making The New America, and had expected it to be their last album. In January 2001, it was reported that Epitaph Records and Bad Religion founder Brett Gurewitz had re-joined the band. He had left the band in 1994 to focus his efforts on Epitaph; he previously wrote "Believe It" for The New America. Alongside this, it was announced that the band had re-signed to Epitaph, who they left for Atlantic in 1993. In May 2001, it was announced that drummer Bobby Schayer had sustained an inoperable rotator cuff problem, and had left the band as a result.

Throughout June 2001, the band toured across Europe; in the same month, Brooks Wackerman, formerly of Suicidal Tendencies and the Vandals, joined the band as their next drummer. In July 2001, the band said their next album would be titled The Process of Belief, and was planned for release in a few months' time. Later in the month, the band recorded at Sound City Studios and Westbeach Recorders, both in Los Angeles, California, with Gurewitz and Graffin as producers. Gurewitz was critical of the previous producers the band worked with, stating that he understood them better than anyone. Billy Joe Bowers handled recording, while Jeff Mosis and Philip Brousard acted as assistant engineers. In September 2001, Gurewitz mixed almost every track at Larrabee East except for "Epiphany", which was done by Jerry Finn. Bob Ludwig mastered the album at Gateway.

Composition
The Process of Belief is a punk rock album, which was compared to Bad Religion's sixth and seventh studio albums, Generator (1992) and Recipe for Hate (1993). The album's title was taken from a lyric in "Materialist", which Gurewitz felt summarizes the band's name fittingly. The opening track, "Supersonic", discusses the speed at which life changes. "Broken" is a mid-tempo rock song, and is followed by "Destined for Nothing", which evokes parts of Recipe for Hate. "Materialist" is an anti-religious track; Gurewitz said it referred to "belief in God and the biological process that causes the belief in God." "Kyoto Now!" is about the Kyoto Protocol to reduce Greenhouse gases and pollution.

"Sorrow" was inspired by the biblical figure Job, with Gurewitz saying it was "very difficult to account for suffering in the world from a theological perspective". The song opens with a Police-esque ska beat, before switching to the band's typical melodic hardcore sound. "Epiphany" is a mid-tempo song that talks about the negatives of self-examination, and is similar in form to "Stickin in My Eye" (1992) by NOFX. The mid-tempo rock song "The Defense" is an attack on the Patriot Act, and features sitar playing from Mikaleno. The opening guitar riff in "The Lie" recalled on the one heard in "I Want to Conquer the World", a track from the band's fourth studio album No Control (1989). "You Don't Belong" deals with the positives and negatives of nostalgia. The closing track, "Bored and Extremely Dangerous", is about the issues facing pre-Columbine kids.

Release
In August 2001, The Process of Belief was delayed from October 2001 to early 2002, which Bentley said was due to the Epitaph's aversion to releasing albums during the holiday season. On October 5, 2001, the album's artwork was posted on the label's website. On October 31, "Sorrow" was made available for free download through the label's website, followed by "Can't Stop It" on November 15, through eMusic. On January 11, 2002, "Supersonic" was made available for free download through a microsite for the album. The Process of Belief was made available for streaming between January 18 and 22, before it was eventually released on January 22, 2002. To promote its release, the band held four releases shows across San Francisco and Los Angeles, California, and appeared on Late Night with Conan O'Brien.

The music video for "Sorrow" was posted online on January 29, 2002. On February 8, the band performed "Sorrow" on The Late Late Show with Craig Kilborn. Following this, the band embarked on tour of Europe in February 2002, and a tour of the US in March, with support from Hot Water Music and Less Than Jake. In April 2002, the band performed at the Groezrock festival in Europe. "Broken" was released as a single on April 22, 2002; the CD version featured the non-album track "Shattered Faith", "Supersonic", and the music video for "Sorrow". Three days later, the music video for "Broken" was posted on the band's website. Between late June and mid-August, the group went on the 2002 edition of Warped Tour. In September, the band performed at the Inland Invasion festival. They were due to tour Australia and New Zealand in October; however, the trek was cancelled for unknown reasons. In April and May 2003, the band embarked on a US west coast tour, with support from Sparta and Snapcase, and headlined the Slam City Jam. In September, the band went on another west coast tour, which included several multi-day shows in different cities. Some of the shows were supported by the Living End, Maxeen, and Throw Rag.

Reception

The Process of Belief was met with generally favourable reviews from music critics. At Metacritic, which assigns a normalized rating out of 100 to reviews from mainstream publications, the album received an average score of 74, based on 13 reviews.

The staff at E! Online said Gurewitz's return to Bad Religion "prove[d] rejuvenating for all. With the combustible reunited dynamic" between Graffin and Gurewitz, "the band has energy and urgency anew". RTÉ reviewer Harry Guerin said that despite the band members being double the age of modern acts, the album "finds them growing old gracefully and highlights how much a new generation needs their open-your-eyes anthems." Entertainment Weekly write Jim Farber said the album had "catchier melodies and more breathlessly clever wordplay" than the band's previous releases. Joachim Hiller of Ox-Fanzine wrote that the band hade "created the[ir] best album in years", having sidestepped the "mediocrity and insignificance" of their previous two "not really bad, but irrelevant albums". Yahoo! Launch's Rob O'Connor called it "a MY-T-FINE punk rock album, chock full of swirling harmonies", though there was "no real surprises here".

Phil Udell of Hot Press wrote that the band come across as "sounding as fresh and inspired as in their early days ... [with] sweet harmonies and a passionate belief in the power of music." Rolling Stone writer Tom Moon said the album had "fourteen throttling songs designed to remind Sum 41's worshippers about the oft-neglected cerebral side of punk." Slant Magazine contributor Aaron Scott found the album to be "supercharged with Gurewitz’s solid production and enough old school Bad Religion hooks to begin healing years of perceived misdirection," however, it was "not a big enough band-aid to cover all the cuts of time." AllMusic reviewer Jack Rabid wrote that repeated listens of the album awards the listener with "brute, lashing power and wild honey melodies" that disarm "such critical impulses as efficiently as a martial arts master." Pitchfork Rob Mitchum found that on occasion, Graffin and Gurewitz display a "strong hook-writing ability"; however, the majority of the album was "indistinguishable from anything post-No Control".

The Process of Belief peaked at number 49 on the Billboard 200 album chart, and also number 1 on Top Independent Albums. It became the first Bad Religion album to chart on the Irish Charts. Alternative Press ranked "Sorrow" at number 56 on their list of the best 100 singles from the 2000s.

Track listing
All songs written by Greg Graffin and Brett Gurewitz except where noted.

Personnel 
Personnel per booklet.

Bad Religion
 Jay Bentley –  bass, backing vocals
 Brian Baker – guitar
 Greg Graffin – lead and backing vocals
 Brett Gurewitz – guitar, backing vocals
 Greg Hetson – guitar
 Brooks Wackerman – drums

Additional musicians
 Mikaleno – sitar (track 11)

Production and design
 Brett Gurewitz – producer, mixing (all except track 9)
 Greg Graffin – producer
 Billy Joe Bowers – recording
 Jerry Finn – mixing (track 9)
 Jeff Moses – assistant engineer
 Phillip Brousard – assistant engineer
 Bob Ludwig – mastering
 Mackie Osborne – art direction, design
 Chris Martin – praying family illustration

Charts

Weekly charts

Year-end charts

References

External links

The Process of Belief at YouTube (streamed copy where licensed)

Bad Religion albums
2002 albums
Epitaph Records albums